Venkatapur is a village and a mandal in Mulugu district in the state of Telangana, India. It is the second-largest revenue village of the district, comprising around 12,000 people.

See also 
Ramappa Temple

References 

Villages in Mulugu district